Hậu Nghĩa is a township and capital of Đức Hòa District in Long An Province, Vietnam.

Hậu Nghĩa was originally the village of Bao Trai (Bàu Trai) in Đức Hòa District, Chợ Lớn Province. In 1963, Bao Trai was renamed Khiem Cuong (Khiêm Cường) and became the capital of the newly formed Hậu Nghĩa Province. However, in February 1976, Hậu Nghĩa Province was dissolved and Đức Hòa District was annexed by Long An Province, Khiêm Cường lost its provincial capital status and became the present-day township of Hậu Nghĩa.

References

Populated places in Long An province
District capitals in Vietnam
Townships in Vietnam